"Min Orkizesai" (English: "Don't take an oath") is a pop song performed by Greek singer/songwriter Eleftheria Arvanitaki with lyrics by Nikos Moraitis. The song was produced for Arvanitaki's greatest hits compilation Dinata 1986-2007 and was released as the album's first single. "Min Orkizesai" is a cover version of "Come Mona Lisa" by the Italian singer Mango, from the album Sirtaki (1990).

Formats and track listings
Digital Download
 "Min Orkizesai" (Come Mona Lisa) [Mobile Version] – 4:53

Digital Download 2
 "Min Orkizesai" (Come Mona Lisa) [Tango Mix by Soumka] – 4:24

Promotional Only CD Single
 "Min Orkizesai" (Come Mona Lisa) [Radio Edit] – 3:46
 "Min Orkizesai" (Come Mona Lisa) [Album Version] – 4:48

References

2007 singles
Eleftheria Arvanitaki songs
Greek-language songs
Songs written by Mogol (lyricist)
1990 songs